Matanui bathytaton, known commonly as the Chatham deep-water triplefin, is a species of triplefin blenny in the genus Matanui. It was described by Graham S. Hardy in 1989.

References

Chatham deep-water triplefin
Fish described in 1989